The Mother and the Enemy is the fourth studio album by the Polish symphonic black metal group Lux Occulta. It expands upon the band's signature sound by incorporating influences from a variety of styles, including free jazz, trip hop, death metal, industrial music, electronica, and spoken word.

Track listing 
 "Breathe In" – 0:54
 "Mother Pandora" – 5:46
 "Architecture" – 5:53
 "Most Arrogant Life Form" – 3:50
 "Yet Another Armageddon" – 3:28
 "Gambit" – 6:12
 "Midnight Crisis" – 6:34
 "Pied Piper" – 9:15
 "Missa Solemnis" – 7:44
 "Breathe Out" – 4:11

References 

2001 albums
Lux Occulta albums